Charles Steele Jr. (born August 3, 1946) is an American businessman, politician and civil rights leader. He was the first African American elected to the City Council of Tuscaloosa and one of the first African Americans elected to the Alabama State Senate. From 2004 to 2009, he was the National President and CEO of the Southern Christian Leadership Conference, co-founded by Martin Luther King Jr. Steele is the founder and President of Charles Steele and Associates, located in Atlanta, Georgia.

Education
Steele was born in Tuscaloosa, Alabama. He graduated high school from Druid City High School in Tuscaloosa, Alabama and attended college at Mississippi Valley State University and Oakland University. He received his bachelor's degree from American International University at the Paramaribo, Suriname, South America campus. He earned a doctoral degree from Mt. Carmel Theological Seminary. He also holds an honorary Doctor of Human Letters degree from Stillman College in Tuscaloosa, Alabama, an honorary Doctorate of Christian Education from The F.T. Bozeman School of Ministry and Global Evangelical Christian College of Louisiana.

Political career
In 1985 he was elected to the Tuscaloosa City Council, where he served two terms. During his tenure as city councilman, he organized the Unity Day Scholarship Fund, the Tuscaloosa Police Athletic League, and secured funds for the purchase of Palmore Park and Barrs’ Quarters (Charles Steele Estates). This was the first homeownership program in West Alabama. He obtained the funds to build the Bernice Washington Insight Center, a drug treatment center. He organized the Tuscaloosa Drug Task Force and after many years of relenting efforts, the Partners For a Drug Free Tuscaloosa County (formerly Tuscaloosa Drug Task Force). During that time the partnership was awarded $1 million.

In 1994, he was elected to the Alabama State Senate and re-elected three times before resigning to become president of the SCLC in November 2004. In April 2006, he was inducted into the Martin Luther King Jr. Board of Preachers of Morehouse College. On April 20, 2006, he was inducted into the Tuscaloosa Civic Hall of Fame.

References

External links

 Southern Christian Leadership Conference

African-American state legislators in Alabama
Activists for African-American civil rights
Alabama city council members
American chief executives
1946 births
Living people
Mississippi Valley State University alumni
Oakland University alumni
Politicians from Tuscaloosa, Alabama
Alabama state senators
20th-century American politicians
African-American activists
21st-century American politicians